Scheepers is the debut solo album from Ralf Scheepers, lead vocalist of the German heavy metal band Primal Fear.

Track listing
"Locked in the Dungeon" - 4:08
"Remission of Sin" - 4:09
"Cyberfreak" - 3:45
"The Fall" - 4:05
"Doomsday" - 6:28
"Saints of Rock" (Tyran' Pace cover) - 4:32
"Before the Dawn" (Judas Priest cover) - 3:06
"Back on the Track" - 4:40
"Dynasty" - 3:57
"The Pain of the Accused" - 6:18
"Play with Fire" - 4:08
"Compassion" - 3:16

Credits
Ralf Scheepers - Lead & Backing Vocals; Acoustic Guitar; Keyboards
Magnus Karlsson: Lead Guitars; Guitars; Banjo; Accordion; Keyboards
Sander Gommans: Lead Guitar, Guitars
Mat Sinner: Bass, Keyboards
Snowy Shaw: Drums

Guest Appearances:

Tim “Ripper” Owens: Lead Vocals on “Remission of Sin”
Kai Hansen; Mike Chlasciak; Alex Beyrodt; Victor Smolski: Lead Guitars

2011 albums
Frontiers Records albums